Tira is the first polka dot zebra found in the Masai Mara National Reserve in Kenya. Similarly patterned zebra foals have been seen before in Botswana. Tira, a  plains zebra (Equus quagga) who is mostly black, with white spots, was first discovered and named by a local guide named Tira.

The dotted color is a genetic condition popularly called pseudomelanism. One geneticist suggests "spotted" or "partially spotted" may be a better description as "pseudomelanism" is not well defined.

References 

2019 animal births
Individual animals in Kenya
Individual wild animals
Zebras